The Dorset Echo is a daily newspaper published in the county of Dorset, England.

The title publishes Monday to Saturday from editorial offices in Weymouth, and covers issues concerning south, central and west Dorset. The Saturday edition is usually accompanied by a separate lifestyle magazine called "Weekend", which is produced in-house.

The Dorset Echo is a sister paper to the Bournemouth based Daily Echo and is owned by the Newsquest Media Group. In the period December 2010–June 2011, it had an average daily circulation of 17,429. This had dropped to an audited average daily circulation of 9,331 for the period July 2017–December 2017.

References

External links
 Official website

Newspapers published in Dorset
Newspapers published by Newsquest
Daily newspapers published in the United Kingdom